Frank Stamp (1905 – May 27, 1954) was born in St. John's, Newfoundland and later became a police officer and a professional boxer.

Stamp had joined the Royal Newfoundland Constabulary in 1925 at age 20 and went on to become a light heavyweight champion who fought many of the best boxers in his weight class in Canada and the United States. In 1930, he resigned from the constabulary to go to Boston to pursue a professional boxing career, returned two years later and rejoined the constabulary.  Stamp was known and loved by the children of the community whom followed along on sections of his beat chatting and playing and occasionally enjoyed a sweet distributed by the kind officer.  Stamp known by all as a gentleman, had a legendary record of thwarting violent attacks with a reliable right hook.

Stamp had joined Jack Sharkey's Camp in Boston before turning professional.

He married Phyllis Young in 1935 and she died in 1942, still in her twenties, leaving her husband to raise their only child Anita, then four years of age. She was 18 years old at the time of his death.

Stamp died suddenly collapsing while writing up his police report at the station, then located in the lowest level of the Supreme Court of Newfoundland courthouse.  While working the beat in St. John's on May 27, 1954 at 1:35 a.m., he chased and arrested two American servicemen for assault and disorderly conduct, one of whom had thrown a rock while attempting to flee striking Stamp in the forehead.  Many stories reaching legendary proportion were told around the dinner tables of many city residents in the years following Frank's death right up to today.

Stamp was immortalized on Sunday, September 25, 2005, when his name was engraved on the National Police and Peace Officers Memorial panel on Parliament Hill, Ottawa.

See also
List of people of Newfoundland and Labrador

References

1905 births
1954 deaths
Light-heavyweight boxers
Sportspeople from St. John's, Newfoundland and Labrador
Canadian male boxers
Dominion of Newfoundland people